Index (or its plural form indices) may refer to:

Arts, entertainment, and media

Fictional entities
 Index (A Certain Magical Index), a character in the light novel series A Certain Magical Index
 The Index, an item on a Halo megastructure in the Halo series of video games

Periodicals and news portals
 Index Magazine, a publication for art and culture
 Index.hr, a Croatian online newspaper
 index.hu, a Hungarian-language news and community portal
 The Index (Kalamazoo College), a student newspaper
 The Index, an 1860s European propaganda journal created by Henry Hotze to support the Confederate States of America
 Truman State University Index, a student newspaper

Other arts, entertainment and media
 The Index (band)
 Indexed, a Web cartoon by Jessica Hagy
 Index, album by Ana Mena

Business enterprises and events 
 Index (retailer), a former UK catalogue retailer
 INDEX, a market research fair in Lucknow, India
 Index Corporation, a Japanese video game developer

Finance
 Index fund, a collective investment scheme
 Stock market index, a statistical average of prices of selected securities

Places in the United States
 Index, Arkansas, an unincorporated community 
 Index, Kentucky, an unincorporated community 
 Index, Missouri, a ghost town
 Index, New York, a hamlet in Hartwick and Otsego, New York
 Index, Virginia, an unincorporated community
 Index, Washington, a town 
 Index, West Virginia, an unincorporated community

Publishing and library studies
 Bibliographic index, a regularly updated publication that lists articles, books, or other information items
 Citation index
 The Index, colloquial name for Germany's List of Media Harmful to Young People, published by the Bundesprüfstelle für jugendgefährdende Medien
 Index card, used for recording and storing small amounts of data 
 Index Librorum Prohibitorum, a list of publications which the Catholic Church censored
 Index on Censorship, a publishing organization that campaigns for freedom of expression, or its magazine of the same name
 Index (publishing), an organized list of information in a publication
 Index (typography), a hand- or fist-shaped punctuation mark
 Subject indexing, describing the content of a document by keywords
 Thumb index, a round cut-out in the pages of a publication
 Web indexing, Internet indexing

Science, technology, and mathematics

Computer science
 Index, a key in an associative array
 Index (typography), a character in Unicode, its code is 132
 Index, the dataset maintained by search engine indexing
 Array index, an integer pointer into an array data structure
 BitTorrent index, a list of .torrent files available for searches
 Database index, a data structure that improves the speed of data retrieval
 Index mapping of raw data for an array
 Index register, a processor register used for modifying operand addresses during the run of a program
 Indexed color, in computer imagery
 Indexed Sequential Access Method (ISAM), used for indexing data for fast retrieval
 Lookup table, a data structure used to store precomputed information
 Site map, or site index, a list of pages of a web site accessible to crawlers or users
 Web indexing, Internet indexing
 Webserver directory index, a default or index web page in a directory on a web server, such as index.html

Economics
 Index (economics), a single number calculated from an array of prices and quantities
 Price index, a typical price for some good or service

Mathematics and statistics
 Index, a number or other symbol that specifies an element of an indexed family or set
 Index, an element of an index set
 Index, the label of a summand in Σ-notation of a summation

Algebra 
 Index of a subgroup, the number of a subgroup's left cosets
 Index, the degree of an nth root
 Index of a linear map, the dimension of the map's kernel minus the dimension of its cokernel
 Index of a matrix
 Index of a real quadratic form

Analysis 
 Index, the winding number of an oriented closed curve on a surface relative to a point on that surface
 Diversity index, a measure of distribution or variety in fields such as ecology or information science
 Index of a vector field, an integer that helps to describe the behaviour of a vector field around an isolated zero

Number theory 
 Index, or the discrete logarithm of a number

Statistics
 Index (statistics), a type of aggregate measure
 Scale (social sciences), a method of reporting data in social sciences, sometimes called an index

Other uses in science and technology
 Dental indices, standardized scoring systems for tooth problems 
 Indexicality, in linguistics, the phenomenon of a sign pointing to some object in the context in which it occurs
 Indexing (motion), in mechanical engineering and machining, movement to a precisely known location
 Refractive index, a measurement of how light propagates through a material
 Valve Index, a virtual reality headset

Other uses
 INDEX, earlier name for the Reimei satellite
 Index:, a Danish nonprofit organization which promotes Design for Life
 The Index (Dubai), a skyscraper
 Index (crater), a moon crater

See also
 Indexer (disambiguation)